Tobias Sorensen is a Danish male model.

Early life 
Sorensen was born in Copenhagen. He grew up in Søborg. As a child, he was attacked by a dog, giving him his signature scar on his left cheek.

Career 
Sorensen was discovered by an Elite Model Management agent while working at a clothing store. Weeks later he went to Paris Fashion Week to walk in the Kris Van Assche show. He has walked for Dolce & Gabbana, Vivienne Westwood, Giorgio Armani, and Elie Tahari.

Sorensen appeared in an Eternity Now campaign for Calvin Klein with then-girlfriend, American model Jasmine Tookes. He has also been in a Calvin Klein Underwear advertisement with American model Joan Smalls. Other advertisement campaigns include Kenzo, DKNY, Versace, UGG Australia, Belstaff, Hugo Boss, and Buffalo by David Bitton.

Sorensen ranks as on the "Money Guy" and "Sexiest Men" lists on models.com

Personal life 
Sorensen was in a relationship with Jasmine Tookes from 2012 to 2016.

References 

Living people
1987 births
Danish male models
Danish expatriates in the United States
People from Gladsaxe Municipality